The Manly Cove Pavilion is a heritage-listed former dressing pavilion and amenities block and now public amenities and restaurant at West Esplanade, Manly, Northern Beaches Council, New South Wales, Australia. The property is owned by Roads & Maritime Services, an agency of the Government of New South Wales. It was added to the New South Wales State Heritage Register on 18 April 2000.

History 

Built during the interwar period when Manly was a favourite and fashionable seaside resort.

Sequential development (where known): Parts of Wheeler (1842) and Johnston (1842) grants, erected  by Port Jackson and Manly Steamship Company.

Description 

Largely intact exterior retaining the ambience of the interwar Mediterranean style; white painted rendered brick, decorative ceramic tile insets and arched colonnade.

Ferro-concrete two storey tiled roof pavilion built on pier. Colonnade to ground floor. Capitals to columns have fish, shell and acanthus leaf decoration; original wrought iron balustrading between columns beside water.

Pavilion walls have decorative tile inlays using burnt orange and ultramarine ceramic tiles. A Greek key motif pattern is surmounted by semi- circular tiles which is in turn surmounted by ceramic decoration in scrolls and by urns.

There is a strong Spanish influence throughout. The toilet block is of the same period. Special elements include the tile inlay bearing the letter "M", the floral motif in cornice decoration, original tiling to walls and the timber pagoda-style entry.

Condition 

As at 15 June 1998, it was in a good condition. Largely intact exterior retaining the ambience of the interwar Mediterranean style.

Largely intact exterior.

Modifications and dates 
The original pavilion has undergone interior refurbishment  - restaurant fitout.

Heritage listing 
As at 12 June 1998, it was one of the few remaining harbour pavilion structures of this period and style in Sydney.

Manly Cove Pavilion was listed on the New South Wales State Heritage Register on 18 April 2000 having satisfied the following criteria.

The place is important in demonstrating the course, or pattern, of cultural or natural history in New South Wales.

For its associations with the early 20th century developments of the Manly seaside resort.

The sandstone pillar is a relic from past maritime activity and is evidence of Sydney Harbour's nautical development and early evidence of interest in retaining and re-using old buildings.

The place is important in demonstrating aesthetic characteristics and/or a high degree of creative or technical achievement in New South Wales.

As an intact example of the interwar Mediterranean style.

The place is important in demonstrating the principal characteristics of a class of cultural or natural places/environments in New South Wales.

One of few remaining harbour pavilion structures of this period and style in Sydney.

See also 

Australian non-residential architectural styles

References

Bibliography

Attribution 

New South Wales State Heritage Register
Manly, New South Wales
Restaurants in New South Wales
Public toilets in Australia
Pavilions
Tourist attractions in Sydney
Articles incorporating text from the New South Wales State Heritage Register